Chea Serey (born 1 January 1981) is a Cambodian economist, Assistant Governor and the current Director General of the National Bank of Cambodia. She is also the chairwoman of the Credit Bureau Cambodia Ltd., the first and only privately run credit sharing system in Cambodia.

Biography

Education 
Chea Serey was born in Phnom Penh in 1981, from educated parents who had survived the systematic elimination of all intellectuals by the Khmer Rouge communists. Chea Serey attended Baktouk Primary School until the sixth grade and then moved to France at the age of eight, where she studied secondary school. Her family moved to Singapore where she studied her last year of high school at the French International School. In 1999, Chea Serey graduated from Victoria University in Wellington, New Zealand, with a degree in commerce, majoring in accounting and finance. In 2021, she graduated with a Doctor of Philosophy (Ph.D.) in Economics from University of Adelaide, Australia.

Working Background 
In 2000, the National Bank of Cambodia ordered the liquidation of 17 banks that were unable to meet the minimum requirement of $13 million in paid-up capital. In 2002, she joined the National Bank of Cambodia's banking supervision department and has risen through the ranks since then.

As Director General, in 2018, Chea Serey led a crackdown on fraudulent microcredit institutions, which had multiplied since 1993 in Cambodia's war–torn economy to help its slow recovery, becoming a huge presence in the redevelopment of the Cambodian economy, providing credit to urban and rural communities to help micro-enterprises. In the first half of 2018 alone, however, the National Bank of Cambodia terminated the licenses of 50 rural credit operators in the Kingdom for failing to comply with the rules and regulations of the central bank.

In 2019, Chea Serey was faced with a report of the LICADHO accusing the central bank of allowing predatory lending in the micro-finance sector which she responded by criticizing a "concerted attack" motivated by an ideological bias in favour of a “socialist economy”, organized to destabilize the lending sector in Cambodia.

Chea Serey's competence in reforming the banking sector in Cambodia was rewarded internationally in 2020 when she was named by the Bank for International Settlements on the panel of judges of the G20 TechSprint initiative.

After the banking sector in Cambodia was hit hard by the Coronavirus pandemic, Chea Serey expressed optimism for its prompt recovery through public-private partnership.

Contribution

Digital leapfrogging in Cambodia 
Chea Serey took an active part in the digitalization of the Khmer economy. In 2017, in order to replace an outdated infrastructure which made the cost of making transactions too high – due to financial institutions with heavy paperwork, over-staffing and waste of time, Chea Serey launched the National Bank of Cambodia Platform, a trading system that allows all financial institutions to make transactions online. Under her leadership, retail payment infrastructure has been modernized: she also led the effort to introduce new electronic payment system based in QR codes. This dynamic had ripple effects on many sectors of the economy. As of 2018, Chea Serey noted that “twenty years ago, telecommunication cost in Cambodia was the highest in ASEAN according to an ADB study, but now I can confidently say that access to Internet is the cheapest in the ASEAN."

Banking boom in Cambodia 
As director of the Central Bank of Cambodia, Chea Serey has overlooked the restoration of Cambodia's banking system, which depletion has been symbolized by the blowing up to the headquarters of the central bank in Phnom Penh under the Khmer Rouge. When Chea Serey started work at the National Bank of Cambodia, there were 16 banks and now there are 38, seven or which are specialised banks and 32 commercial banks.

Chea Serey was an early supporter of the potential of blockchain technology but has been cautious about the development of cryptocurrencies in Cambodia. Though the National Bank of Cambodia is launching its own blockchain technology, which allows secure digital currency transactions, the body is not willing to trust all cryptocurrencies. Director General Chea Serey called the fintech “a new form of fraud” in a conference in November, and later banned initial coin offerings from Cambodia-based currencies.

From de-dollarization to Bakong blockchain currency 
The dollarization of the Cambodian economy is an issue which Chea Serey explains was a consequence of Cambodia coming out of post-conflict poverty and the UNTAC period. Already in December 2016, the National Bank of Cambodia released a directive instructing commercial banks and microfinance institutions in Cambodia to issue a greater percentage of their loans in the local currency, a regulation that aims to promote the use of the riel, Cambodia's national currency. Later, in July 2017, Chea Serey was responsible for drafting Cambodia's first draft national strategy on promoting the riel. In order to boost the riel, and avoir the dependency on the dollar, Chea Serey also promoted the use of the Chinese yuan in trade with China, as similar arrangements are being pursued with Asean nations, particularly Thailand and Vietnam, while continuing to encourage the preferential use of the Khmer riel.
 She also believes that blockchain technology can help to boost trust in government banking. In her own words, Bakong is not a central bank digital currency, because many of its elements do not fit that definition, but a backbone payment system. As of March 2022, 270,000 Cambodians use this Bakong digital currency on a daily basis and these services have reached around 7.9 million people, which is almost half of the country's population of 16.7 million inhabitants. By the end of 2021, 6.8 million transactions, worth around $2.9 billion, had been recorded by the National Bank of Cambodia.

Recognition 
Chea Serey is a member of Young Global Leaders, Class of 2019, a forum of Young Global Leaders created by the World Economic Forum.

In 2021, she received the Nikkei award for the financial inclusion of the Bakong digital currency which she had launched in 2020.

Serey has also been recognized in 2021 as a "hero of philanthropy" by the LA Weekly through the Raska Koma foundation, which she has established for providing much needed healthcare to Cambodian children coming from impoverished families.

References

Bibliography 
 

1981 births
Living people
Cambodian women
Women economists
Victoria University of Wellington alumni